I Deal in Danger is a 1966 American DeLuxe Color spy film compiled from the first four episodes of a television series, Blue Light, which aired on ABC-TV in early 1966.  Directed by Walter Grauman, it starred Robert Goulet as David March, an Allied spy in Nazi Germany during World War II. He is aided by a French agent, Susanne Duchard, played by Christine Carère.

Plot
In Nazi Germany during World War II, David March (Robert Goulet) is an American traitor who has been given wide access to travel as he wishes within Germany. Unbeknownst to the Germans, March is actually an American spy, the last remaining from a spy ring, known as Blue Light. As time goes on, he has been able to work his way higher and higher within the Nazi intelligence apparatus, however he is suspected by a Nazi Gestapo officer, Captain Elm (Werner Peters). Along the way, he meets Susanne Duchard (Christine Carère), a French agent, who he has a romantic interlude with, and persuades her to help him.

Elm fosters a plan to expose March by taking him to Spain to meet with a British scientist, Guy Spauling (Donald Harron), who wants to defect to Germany. Elm knows that Spauling is a British agent. Spauling asks March to kill him, in order to validate March's standing with the Gestapo, but March instead uses the opportunity to frame Elm as the Blue Light agent, and kills him.

March's goal becomes the destruction of secret Nazi weapons factory, which produces missiles for U-boats. He has romantic interludes with a German scientist, Gretchen Hoffmann (Eva Pflug), working at the missile factory, convincing her to assist in his plans to blow up the facility. March and Duchard escape the destruction of the plant, but Hoffman dies in the explosion.

Cast
The cast list, according to Turner Classic Movies:

 Robert Goulet as David March
 Christine Carère as Suzanne Duchard
 Donald Harron as Spauling
 Horst Frank as Luber
 Werner Peters as Elm
 Eva Pflug as Gretchen Hoffmann
 Christiane Schmidtmer as Ericka von Lindendorf
 John Van Dreelen as Von Lindendorf
 Hans Reiser as Richter
 Margit Saad as The Baroness
 Peter Capell as Eckhardt
 Osman Ragheb as Brunner
 John Alderson as Gorleck
 Dieter Eppler as Stolnitz
 Dieter Kirchlechner as Becker
 Manfred Andrea as Dr. Zimmer
 Alexander Allerson as Draus
 Paul Glawion as the submarine pilot

See also
 List of American films of 1966

References

External links
 
 
 
 
 

1960s spy thriller films
American spy thriller films
World War II spy films
20th Century Fox films
Films about Nazi Germany
Films directed by Walter Grauman
Films edited from television programs
Films with screenplays by Larry Cohen
1960s English-language films
1960s American films